The Mouse with the Question Mark Tail is a 2013 children's novel written by Richard Peck and illustrated Kelly Murphy.  The book is set in the same universe as  Secrets at Sea.  The novel is suitable as reading for grades four through six.

Set in Victorian England, the story features a mouse who tries to discover his origins by asking Queen Victoria.

Plot
The story of a mouse in London in search of information about his identity. A rollicking adventure that brings him to Windsor Castle.

A Royal Reminder

=Part One: The Royal Mews

The Smallest Mouse in the Mews

Mouse Minor at School

Two Crimes

Evening Stables

Part Two: The Royal Park

Peg's Ear

A Life of Drum and Trumpet

Yeomice on Parade

Snatched and Dispatched

Part Three: The Royal Palace

Midnight

Eyes and Spies

A Rush of Black Wings

A Field of Gray

A Hard Mouse to Convince

Ludovic the 237th

Characters
 Mouse Minor/Prince Ludovic - The protagonist. He is a white mouse who was born in London England. He lives in the Royal Mews next door to Buckingham Palace.
 Yeomice - The Captain of the Guard of Mouse Minor's father.
 Aunt Marigold – Mouse Minor's aunt.
 The Mouse Queen – The Queen of the mice of the United Kingdom. She is Mouse Minor's grandmother.
 Queen Victoria - The human Queen of the United Kingdom. In the book, she is celebrating her Diamond Jubilee.
 Fitzherbert and Trevor - They are the bullies of mouse minor. Fitzherbert is the son of the Mouse Permanent Superintendent of the Mews, while Trevor is the son of the Mouse Controller of Stores.  
 Ian
 Prince Bruno Havarti
 Princess Ena – The Queen's granddaughter.
 Prince Albert
 B. Chiroptera
 Queen Ann
 Pegasus
 The Bat Chancellor
 The Mouse Princess – (Uncredited) The Mouse queen's daughter. She is the wife of the Captain of the Guard. She gives birth to Mouse Minor, but dies shortly afterwards.

Reception
Critical reception for The Mouse with the Question Mark Tail has been positive. Commonsensemedia rated the book highly, stating that "In-jokes and historical tidbits will delight older kids and give reading-aloud adults the giggles."

Awards

Best of lists
 2014 3x3 Magazine Annual No.11 3x3 Picture Book Show (Honorable Mention) People Magazine
 2013 Notable Children's Books, The New York Times
 2013 Best Books for Children Kirkus Reviews
 2013 Ten Best Books for Children, People Magazine

Starred reviews
 2013 Starred Review, School Library Journal 
 2013 Starred Review, Publishers Weekly
 2013 Starred Review, Booklist

Illustration competitions
 2014 The Illustrators 56 Travel Show
 2013 Society of Illustrators 56th Annual Competition (Book Category)
 2013 Original Art, Society of Illustrators
 2013 Gold Medal (Children's Market Category), Society of Illustrators of Los Angeles

References

External links 

 

2013 American novels
American children's novels
American young adult novels
Children's historical novels
Children's novels about animals
Fictional mice and rats
2013 children's books
Dial Press books